The Community Living Assistance Services and Supports Act (or CLASS Act) was a U.S. federal law, enacted as Title VIII of the Patient Protection and Affordable Care Act. The CLASS Act would have created a voluntary and public long-term care insurance option for employees, but in October 2011 the Obama administration announced it was unworkable and would be dropped. The CLASS Act was repealed January 1, 2013.

Under the Act the Department of Health and Human Services was to set the terms prior to implementation, but determined the program was not viable and could not go into effect.

The CLASS Act had been "a key priority" of the late Senator Edward "Ted" Kennedy.

Key provisions 
Most of the terms were to be developed by the Department of Health and Human Services over several years. However, certain terms were set in statute:

 Enrollees would have paid a monthly premium, through payroll deduction
 Enrollees would have been covered on a guaranteed-issue basis
 Enrollees would have been eligible for benefits after paying premiums for five years and having worked at least three of those years	
 Enrollees would have received a lifetime cash benefit after meeting benefit eligibility criteria, based on the degree of impairment

Timeline for provisions  
 June 21, 2010: Required the Secretary to establish a Personal Care Attendants Workforce Academy Advisory Panel for the purpose of examining and advising the Secretary and Congress on workforce issues related to personal care attendants
 By January 1, 2011: Established the CLASS Program, as specified
 By January 1, 2011: Addressed infrastructure for personal care attendant workers
 By January 1, 2011: Required information on supplemental coverage from the CLASS program in the National Clearinghouse for Long-Term Care Information
 By January 1, 2012: Would have required the Secretary to (1) establish an Eligibility Assessment System (2) enter into agreements with the Protection and Advocacy System for each state; and (3) enter into agreements with public and private entities to provide advice and assistance counseling.
 By October 1, 2012: Would have required the Secretary to designate a benefit plan as the CLASS Independence Benefit Plan and publish such designation, along with details of the plan and the reasons for the Secretary's selection, in a final rule to allow for a public comment period.
 Beginning January 1, 2014: Would have required the Secretary to submit an annual report to Congress on the CLASS program, as specified.

Goals of the legislation

Expanded availability of long-term care
According to Barbara Manard, a health economist with LeadingAge, the act would have created "a national insurance trust" with a potential "daily cash benefit on the order of about $50 to $75 a day, depending on your level of disability."

Reduce near-term government deficit
The Congressional Budget Office estimated the program would have resulted in $72 Billion in deficit reduction in the first ten years, including $2 Billion in Medicaid savings because of individuals receiving benefits under the CLASS Act that they could have received under Medicaid, and because no benefits would be paid out at all in the first five years. However, in the longer term, the CBO noted that "In the decade following 2029, the CLASS program would begin to increase 
budget deficits" as payouts increased, with the trust fund remaining solvent for a seventy-five year period but running bankrupt after that. The effect on the deficit in the ten-year budget window was particularly important due to the Byrd Rule.

Premiums 
Premium rates were to be determined by the Department of Health and Human Services with subsidies for low-income individuals and students. Premium rates would have varied by issue age. The CLASS program contained an implicit redistribution tax to subsidize lower income and full-time student participants.

Benefits
The legislation did not set specific benefits. The Secretary of Health and Human Services was tasked with developing actuarially sound premiums and benefits.

Many organizations, including the Congressional Budget Office, developed estimates of potential premiums and benefits:

Benefits would have varied by severity of functional limitation, with the average being at least $50 per day. The benefit schedule could have been adjusted in future years by the Secretary.

Enrollment process 
Employers would have auto-enrolled employees through payroll deduction, a negative election similar to some 401(k) plans.

Tax treatment 
Tax treatment would have been the same as for tax-qualified long-term care plans (i.e., benefits would not have been taxable and premiums might have been eligible for medical expense deduction).

Limitations 
Participation would have been limited to employees actively at work, and required a five-year vesting period (including three working years) prior to benefit eligibility.

The CLASS program did not extend coverage to an employee's family members. It was not clear how non-working spouses could enroll in the program or receive benefits due to the requirement that the beneficiary must have had sufficient earnings to be credited with income quarters under the Social Security Act.

The statute says, "No taxpayer funds shall be used for payment of benefits under a CLASS Independent Benefit Plan... the term ‘taxpayer funds’ means any Federal funds from a source other than premiums.... and any associated interest earnings."

Administrative expense 
Administrative expenses, including advocacy and assistance counseling, were to be limited to three percent of premiums.

Repeal efforts
On April 4, 2011, senators John Thune and Lindsey Graham introduced the Repeal the CLASS Entitlement Act citing the potential of it becoming a new entitlement program. It was predicted that enrollees requiring large medical payouts would be attracted to the plan, leading to the inability of the collected premiums to cover all costs.
On July 19, 2011, the Senate so-called Gang of Six, a bipartisan group of senators proposed to repeal the CLASS act as part of a proposal for a balanced budget legislation.

Abandoned by Obama Administration
On October 14, 2011, HHS Secretary Kathleen Sebelius announced that the Obama Administration would not attempt to implement the C.L.A.S.S. Act stating "I do not see a viable path forward for Class implementation at this time."
One actuary opined that adverse selection could make the program financially unsustainable. If correct, this would be because too many people likely to need benefits later in life would buy the insurance, with people unlikely to need the benefits not buying because of the relatively high premiums and the fact the program was voluntary. This would result in more benefits being paid than premiums collected.

Final Repeal
On January 1, 2013, the CLASS Act was officially repealed as part of the American Taxpayer Relief Act of 2012, known as the Fiscal Cliff Bill. This law contains a provision that repeals the Community Living Assistance Services and Supports Act.

Criticisms
Republican opponents of the plan called it "a financial gimmick" to manipulate the Congressional Budget Office deficit projections for the PPACA, while Democratic Senator Kent Conrad called it a "Ponzi scheme," because (a) projected premiums during the vesting period were counted as revenue during the first decade but promised spending would have begun in the second decade, so the CBO's 10-year estimates included the revenue but not the spending, and (b) benefits would cost more than premiums.

Timothy Carney of the Washington Examiner wrote that the Act would have encouraged revolving door behavior, calling the Act "an 'unsustainable' subsidy to companies whose former executives helped write it, and which are now hiring the congressional staff that helped write it."

Similar legislation
In 2019, Washington State passed the WA Cares Act, which created a similar system, the first at the state level in the U.S. As of 2022, implementation has been delayed in order to address some criticisms of various provisions.

References

External links 
 The Sleeper in Health Reform: Long-Term Care and the CLASS Act

United States federal health legislation